Gopal Sharman (19 August 1935 - 16 June 2016) was the author of 14 plays, three books, writer-director of scores of television programmes, many articles and columns, and is best known for his dramatic version of the great epic, The Ramayana, written in English for the Royal Shakespeare Company of Great Britain, which subsequently has been presented on stage more than 2000 times to the highest acclaim in India and the theatre capitals of the West. Gopal Sharman was modern India's maverick artist par excellence! 80 million watched his TV series India Alive. On Broadway, his epic play The Ramayana earned rave reviews. He composed his own music. The Akshara Theatre, situated on Baba Kharak Singh Marg, was constructed (including the furniture and lights) by him in the early 1970s. It is a hub of cultural activity in New Delhi and is studied by architecture students. His political satires pack a deadly punch and his poetry reminded President Radhakrishnan of the Upanishads.

Early life and career
Born in Calcutta, India, on 19 August 1935, Gopal was the sixth child  of Dr. Buddhidhan Sharman, a medical doctor of repute, and his wife Savitri. Both parents were Sanskrit scholars and ardent fighters in the cause of India's independence from British rule.

Sharman started his working life as a journalist in Lucknow and Calcutta but shifted to Delhi in 1958, where he began writing on the performing arts for several major Indian newspapers. He later moved to London where he wrote on the arts for The Times, London and The Sunday Times  . His highly acclaimed book on India music, Filigree in Sound was published in London by Andre Deutsch. He has also written columns for the Washington Post in the United States.
His theatrical career was launched by Professor Radhakrishnan, President of India with a reading of Gopal's poems and stories at the Rashtrapati Bavan by his wife Jalabala. Shortly after the couple embarked on a tour that took them to Europe and international high praise from critics and audiences alike. This first production, Full Circle, was followed by an invitation from the Royal Shakespeare Company of Great Britain to bring a play to their World Theatre Season. The play in question was Sharman's The Ramayana, a play in English in four acts that retold the epic story from a contemporary viewpoint, but without any loss of reverence.

Poetry & Plays
Sharman rose to prominence as a playwright and director with his very first production, Full Circle, a collection of his stories and poems dramatically performed by his actress wife, Jalabala Vaidya .

Full Circle had its London premiere at the Mercury Theatre, where T.S. Eliot's Murder in the Cathedral and Christopher Fry's Ascent of F6 had also had their world premieres. The Sunday Times hailed Sharman as a new major poet and said of Jalabala Vaidya: she performs exquisitely . The Guardian described Sharman as a Renaissance man who would leave any Medici panting well in the rear. The production, an inspired view of contemporary India with its mixture of pointless poverty, classical Indian thought, comic asides on cobweb-shrouded government departments, and pure lyricism is obviously inspired by Sharman's early life.
Sharman returned to India to write his dramatic, contemporary version of the 5000-year-old Indian epic, The Ramayana, for the RSC.

The Ramayana on Broadway
The power and beauty of Sharman's play, widely acclaimed and applauded by purists and modernists alike in India, Jalabala's 'tour de force' performance, and Sharman's superb direction and production design have made The Ramayana, with more than 2000 performances to date, something of a legend in contemporary world theatre. It has played on Broadway in New York, on London's West End, the United Nations Headquarters in New York, where it received a standing ovation, the Smithsonian Institution in Washington D.C., the National Theatres of Finland and Canada — even in the Bahamas and the Fiji Islands — and in more cities and towns in India than any other theatrical production since after Independence. Robert A. Hendrickson first produced the play on Broadway, New York in 1975.

When The Ramayana played in New York, the New York Times hailed Sharman's play as "India's Gift to Broadway"  On the U.S. West Coast, poet Gene Detro wrote in Portland's Oregon Journal: "Both poet playwright Gopal Sharman and his actress wife Jalabala Vaidya are possessed of genius … Sharman's script fuses poetic power with the pacing of a very fine film editor".

The Akshara Theatre, New Delhi
Gopal Sharman has also created an exquisite arts complex in an old Lutyen's bungalow in New Delhi called the Akshara National Classical Theatre, built and designed by himself, and embellished by his own stone carvings. This complex houses three theatres, television production studios and a gallery. Here the couple work and live.   
From the mid-‘80s, Sharman has also made a series of outstanding television programmes and documentaries for television. These include the popular India Alive series, The Kashmir Story, The Sufi Way, Music Alive and My Life is My Song, all telecast nationally. His 11-part series India was telecast on PBS, USA.
Sharman's Akshara Theatre  combines theatre production, television production, a training programme for the classical arts and a publishing division.

Sharman's Plays
Gopal's plays include Full Circle, Larflarflarf, The Ramayana, Let's Laugh Again, India Alive, Karma, Jeevan Geet, The Bhagavad Gita, In Goethe's Magical World, I, Galileo Galilei, Alice& Humpty Dumpty, This and That, etc. His television work has been viewed by millions of Indians and includes the 31-part series India Alive two and a half hour documentary The Kashmir Story,   the 6-part Sufi Way, the 8-part Music Alive, My Life Is My Song, his musical documentary, and the five-part Kathanjali based in his own stories as well as Tagore's Gitanjali and The Kabuliwala.
 
Sharman has written four books: Filigree in Sound on Indian music, published by Andre Deutsch of London; The Ramayana, the epic as a play in English, published by Bharatiya Vidya Bhavan; Don’t Miss It, the story of the Akshara Theatre's beginnings, published by the Akshara Press; and Karma, an Upanishadic musical also published by the Akshara Press.

Gopal and Jalabala have two children, Anasuya and Jai, and three grandchildren; Nisa, Dhruv and Yashna. All of them (including the cats) are involved in theatre, music and film.

References

1935 births
2016 deaths
Indian male poets
Indian male dramatists and playwrights
Dramatists and playwrights from West Bengal
Writers from Kolkata
20th-century Indian dramatists and playwrights
20th-century Indian male writers